The following lists events that happened during 2012 in the Tunisian Republic.

Events

March 

 28 March: Ghazi Beji and Jabeur Mejri are sentenced to imprisonment for "transgressing morality, defamation and disrupting public order" after posting naked caricatures of Muhammad to Facebook.

Sports 

 Tunisia competed at the 2012 Summer Olympics in London, United Kingdom.
 Tunisia competed at the 2012 Summer Paralympics in London, United Kingdom.

References 

 
Years of the 21st century in Tunisia
Tunisia
Tunisia
2010s in Tunisia